The team event competition of the diving events at the 2012 European Aquatics Championships was held on 15 May.

Medalists

Results
The final was held at 19:30.

References 

2012 European Aquatics Championships
European Aquatics Championships